Zheng Yumin (born 14 August 1967) is a former Chinese badminton player.

Career 
Zheng Yumin, born in Fujian, is the younger brother of Zheng Yuli, a former top level player who won medals in World championships and World Cup. Yumin specialised in doubles. In 1988, pairing with Lin Liwen, he won the championship in the first Youth Games. Afterwards, he entered the national team and paired with Zhejiang player Huang Zhanzhong in the men's doubles. In the 1990 Asian Games, Zheng/Huang both won the mixed team Gold Medal. In addition, Zheng won a bronze medal in Individual event with Shi Fangjing in mixed doubles. In the 1993 Asian Championships, Zheng Yumin suddenly fainted during a team match with the Indonesian team in the final. He was later diagnosed with a heart attack. After the National Games at the end of the year, Zheng immediately hung up. After retiring, Zheng Yumin was linked by her brother-in-law Yang Yang and went to Malaysia to teach for a few years. After that, he and his sister's family came to Australia to settle. In 1999, he and Wang Chen came together. Although they were 9 years apart, they finally came together and got engaged in Australia. In 2002, they moved to Hong Kong together, Wang Chen represented Hong Kong in international competitions, and Zheng Yumin became the coach of the Hong Kong men's team. In 2006, after Wang Chen won the Asian Games women's singles championship, the two talents made up a four-year postponed wedding.

Achievements

Asian Games 
Mixed doubles

Asian Championships 
Men's doubles

Asian Cup 
Men's doubles

IBF World Grand Prix 
The World Badminton Grand Prix sanctioned by International Badminton Federation (IBF) since from 1983 to 2006.

Men's doubles

Mixed doubles

IBF International 
Men's doubles

References 

1967 births
Living people
Chinese male badminton players
Badminton players at the 1990 Asian Games
Asian Games bronze medalists for China
Asian Games gold medalists for China
Asian Games medalists in badminton
Medalists at the 1990 Asian Games
World No. 1 badminton players